Giorgos Vourgoutzis (born 3 March 1991) is a Greek football player who plays for Aiolikos. He played for the club during its last season in the Gamma Ethniki.

See also
Football in Greece
List of football clubs in Greece

References

1991 births
Living people
Greek footballers
Association football forwards
Aiolikos F.C. players
People from Mytilene
Sportspeople from the North Aegean